Pyroglutamic acid (also known as PCA, 5-oxoproline, pidolic acid) is a ubiquitous but little studied natural amino acid derivative in which the free amino group of glutamic acid or glutamine cyclizes to form a lactam. The names of pyroglutamic acid conjugate base, anion, salts, and esters are pyroglutamate, 5-oxoprolinate, or pidolate.

It is a metabolite in the glutathione cycle that is converted to glutamate by 5-oxoprolinase.  Pyroglutamate is found in many proteins including bacteriorhodopsin. N-terminal glutamic acid and glutamine residues can spontaneously cyclize to become pyroglutamate, or enzymatically converted by glutaminyl cyclases. This is one of several forms of blocked N-termini which present a problem for N-terminal sequencing using Edman chemistry, which requires a free primary amino group not present in pyroglutamic acid. The enzyme pyroglutamate aminopeptidase can restore a free N-terminus by cleaving off the pyroglutamate residue.

Pyroglutamic acid exists as two distinct enantiomers:
(2R) or D which happens to be (+) or d 
(2S) or L which happens to be (–) or l

Metabolism
As first discovered in 1882, pyroglutamic acid can be formed by heating glutamic acid at 180 °C, which results in the loss of a molecule of water. In living cells, it is derived from glutathione through the action of an enzyme, γ-glutamyl cyclotransferase. Pyroglutamic acid may function in glutamate storage, and acts to oppose the action of glutamate, including in the brain. It also acts on the brain's cholinergic system; Amyloid β containing pyroglutamic acid is increased in Alzheimer's disease; this may be part of the disease process.
Increased levels of pyroglutamic acid in the blood, leading to excess in the urine (5-oxoprolinuria), can occur following paracetamol overdose, as well as in certain inborn errors of metabolism, causing high anion gap metabolic acidosis.

Uses
The sodium salt of pyroglutamic acid—known either as sodium pyroglutamate, sodium PCA, or sodium pidolate—is used for dry skin and hair products, as it is a humectant. It has low toxicity and is not a skin irritant, but its use in products is limited by a high price.

L-pyroglutamic acid is sold online as a nootropic dietary supplement.

Magnesium pidolate, the magnesium salt of pyroglutamic acid, is found in some mineral supplements.
In a preclinical study, additional pharmacological properties of pyroglutamic acid were revealed such as anti-phosphodiesterase type 5,  anti-angiotensin-converting enzyme, and anti-urease activities.

References

Pyrrolidones
Amino acids
Glutamates
Non-proteinogenic amino acids
Cyclic amino acids
Secondary amino acids